Radio Eska is a commercial radio station in Poland. The radio has organized Polish awards ceremony Eska Music Awards since 2002.

External links
Radio Eska webpage

Radio stations in Poland
Mass media in Warsaw
Radio stations established in 1993
1993 establishments in Poland